Xenobalistes tumidipectoris is a species of triggerfish found in the western central Pacific Ocean.

References

Balistidae
Taxa named by Keiichi Matsuura
Fish described in 1981